Tatadim was King of Zagwe dynasty. According to Taddesse Tamrat, he was a son of Mara Takla Haymanot.

Reign
Tatadim's name appears in second place in the long lists of the Zagwe kings. Taddesse Tamrat states that he was the oldest known son of Mara Takla Haymanot.

According to the Gadla Yemrehana Krestos, Tatadim made efforts to secure the succession of kingship for his sons, taking actions against his brothers Jan Seyum and Germa Seyum. The Agaw law of inheritance dictated that his brothers should be his successors, a problem that plagued the Zagwe kings.

References

10th-century monarchs in Africa
Emperors of Ethiopia
Zagwe dynasty